Hollywood Chainsaw Hookers (also known as simply Hollywood Hookers in the United Kingdom) is a 1988 American black comedy slasher film directed by Fred Olen Ray, and starring Gunnar Hansen, Linnea Quigley, Jay Richardson and Michelle Bauer. It is known as a B-movie.

Plot summary
When private detective Jack Chandler (Jay Richardson) tries to track down a teenage runaway (Linnea Quigley), he runs into a cult of Egyptian chainsaw-worshipping prostitutes led by "The Master" (Gunnar Hansen).

Cast
 Linnea Quigley as Samantha 
 Gunnar Hansen as The Stranger 
 Jay Richardson as Jack Chandler 
 Dawn Wildsmith as Lori
 Michelle Bauer as Mercedes
 Esther Elise as Lisa 
 Tricia Burns as Ilsa
 Susie Wilson as Sally
 Fox Harris as Hermie
 Jimmy Williams as Bo
 Dukey Flyswatter as Jake, The Bartender
 Dennis T. Mooney as Mick Harris
 Jerry Miller as Murphy
 Gary J. Levinson as Nubian
 Christopher Ray as Kid At Bar (uncredited)

Release
At the time, the UK video release was not allowed to have the word Chainsaw in the title, so the film was released simply as "Hollywood Hookers" (a drawing of a chainsaw replaced the missing word on the cover sleeve).

Production
The film begins with the disclaimer "The chainsaws used in this motion picture are real and dangerous! They are handled here by seasoned professionals. The makers of this motion picture advise strongly against anyone attempting to perform these stunts at home. Especially if you are naked and about to engage in strenuous sex." The film ends with the promise of the sequel Student Chainsaw Nurses, which was never made.

Reception
Hollywood Chainsaw Hookers received mixed reviews from critics and audiences, earning a Rotten Tomatoes Want-To-See score of 33%.

Home media
Hollywood Chainsaw Hookers has been released on VHS, DVD and Blu-ray format.

In the United States, the film was released in a '20th Anniversary Widescreen Edition' DVD on August 5, 2008. It was made available on Blu-ray in two individual editions on January 9, 2015, with a standard edition and a signed 'Special Limited Edition' of 1000 copies.

In the United Kingdom, the film was released on DVD on July 10, 2000. 88 Films has released the film on Blu-ray on March 23, 2015 as part of the 'Slasher Classics Collection'. It is placed at #6 and like the other films released in the collection, it contains a reversible sleeve.

Sources

References

External links
 
 
 Hollywood Chainsaw Hookers at BadMovies.org

Films directed by Fred Olen Ray
1988 films
1988 horror films
1980s English-language films
1980s comedy horror films
American comedy horror films
Transgender-related films
1980s slasher films
Slasher comedy films
American slasher films
American exploitation films
1988 comedy films
American splatter films
1980s American films
Films about cults
American serial killer films
American black comedy films
Parodies of horror